Walter Sofronoff  is an Australian jurist and lawyer who served as the President of the Queensland Court of Appeal (2017–2022) and as the Solicitor-General of Queensland from 2005 to 2014.

Early life and education
Sofronoff attended the Anglican Church Grammar School in Brisbane, and completed a Bachelor of Arts and Bachelor of Laws (Honours) at the University of Queensland in 1976.

Career
Sofronoff was called to the Bar in 1977 and took silk in 1988.

He served as a member (1980–82), vice-president (1992–94) and president (1994–96) of the Bar Association of Queensland Committee. He has also been a member of the Queensland Incorporated Council of Law Reporting (1999–2004), president of the Queensland Anti-Discrimination Tribunal (2001–05), a member of the Royal Australian Navy Reserve (2003–2014) and a member of The University of Queensland Law School Advisory Board (2014–). In 1999, Justice Sofronoff was an adjunct professor of law at The University of Queensland.

Solicitor-General of Queensland
Sofronoff served as the Solicitor-General of Queensland from 2005 to 2014. He was involved in a number of high-profile cases, including those involving surgeon Jayant Patel and the Aurukun Nine, nine men convicted of the gang rape of a 10-year-old girl in far north Queensland. He resigned as solicitor-general in 2014 amid tensions between the Newman government and the legal fraternity that resulted from the appointment of Tim Carmody as Chief Justice of the Supreme Court of Queensland.

In 2016, Sofronoff was responsible for the successful High Court appeal that overturned the Queensland Court of Appeal's decision to downgrade Gerard Baden-Clay's murder conviction to manslaughter. Although it is normal practice for a sitting solicitor-general to lead High Court appeals, Sofronoff was briefed to appear instead of his successor and solicitor-general at the time, Peter Dunning . After the appeal, it was reported by The Guardian Australia that Sofronoff had charged the Queensland government just $327 plus GST to run the appeal, "despite a QC of Sofronoff's standing usually commanding fees of up to $17,000 a day".

President of the Queensland Court of Appeal
He was appointed President of the Queensland Court of Appeal on 3 April 2017, after President Margaret McMurdo resigned after more than 18 years as a justice of the Court of Appeal. Sofronoff retired from the role on 20 May 2022.

Inquiries and reviews

On 11 May 2015, Sofronoff was appointed as Commissioner for the Grantham Floods Commission of Inquiry. In his written report, Sofronoff concluded that the flood "was a natural disaster and that no human agency caused it or could ever have prevented it".

Sofronoff was appointed to lead a review of Queensland's parole system in 2016.

On 6 June 2022, Sofronoff was appointed as Commissioner for the Commission of Inquiry into Forensic DNA Testing in Queensland.

Personal life
Sofronoff is married. He has three children and one daughter-in-law.

References

 

Judges of the Supreme Court of Queensland
Solicitors-General of Queensland
University of Queensland alumni
Australian King's Counsel
Australian barristers
Living people
Year of birth missing (living people)